Tomasz Kucz (born 6 July 1999) is a Polish professional footballer who plays as a goalkeeper for Greek Super League 2 club Kalamata.

References

External links
 

Tomasz Kucz at playmakerstats.com (English version of zerozero.pt)

1999 births
Living people
Footballers from Warsaw
Polish footballers
Polish expatriate footballers
Poland youth international footballers
Association football goalkeepers
Bayer 04 Leverkusen players
FC DAC 1904 Dunajská Streda players
Slovak Super Liga players
Vitória S.C. players
Polish expatriate sportspeople in Germany
Polish expatriate sportspeople in Slovakia
Polish expatriate sportspeople in Portugal
Expatriate footballers in Germany
Expatriate footballers in Slovakia
Expatriate footballers in Portugal